Morava Airport , also known as Lađevci Airport, is a mixed public and military airport in Lađevci, Serbia - some  from Kraljevo,  from Čačak, and  from Kragujevac. The airport has been divided into two distinct parts: civilian terminal building bears the name "Morava Airport" while the military part is "Lađevci Military Air Base".

History

Early years

Lađevci airbase was originally used as a support airfield for the 98th Fighter-Bomber Aviation Regiment of the Yugoslav Air Force based at Skopski Petrovec airbase in the North Macedonia. After the breakup of Yugoslavia, Lađevci Air Base became more active when the 98th Fighter-Bomber Aviation Regiment was transferred from Skopski Petrovec to Lađevci. From then on at airfield there were few units of Air Force of Serbia and Montenegro, 98th Fighter-Bomber Aviation Regiment with its 241st Fighter-Bomber Aviation Squadron equipped with J-22 Orao attack aircraft, 353rd Reconnaissance Aviation Squadron equipped with IJ-22 Orao reconnaissance aircraft and the 714th Anti-Tank Helicopter Squadron equipped with SA342L Gazelle scout helicopters. During 1999 NATO bombing of Yugoslavia, the airport and runway were badly damaged.

Recent developments

In 2006, the Government of Serbia began conversion of the airport to provide civilian traffic. In the first phase, the new control tower (the former having been destroyed in 1999 by NATO bombing) was constructed. Then in 2011, new terminal building was built that can service both passenger and cargo flights.

The first passenger aircraft at Morava Airport landed on October 4, 2011; a Jat Airways ATR 72-202 carried then-president Boris Tadić along with other government officials for a media briefing regarding the recovery effort from the 2010 Kraljevo earthquake. Jat Airways planned to introduce regular traffic between Kraljevo and Istanbul in 2012, but it never materialized.

As of 2017, Morava Airport has the potential to become an international airport if further efforts are made. The Serbian government has announced the opening of Kraljevo's Morava Airport on June 28, making it the country's third commercial airport after Belgrade and Niš. Wizz Air had previously expressed interest in serving Morava Airport and said it was "monitoring developments". Furthermore, the Serbian government previously announced it was willing to enter into a public-private partnership agreement with a German company which would operate services from Kraljevo to both Frankfurt and Istanbul. The name of the company was not specified. In addition, part of the Raška District, in which Kraljevo is located, has close historical ties with Turkey and a portion of the local population is expected to use this airport, instead of Pristina, for future flights to Istanbul.

Despite the announcements from the Serbian Government that a larger plane, namely Boeing 737, would land on the opening day (28 June 2019), that did not happen. Instead, like 8 years ago, a twin-engine turboprop ATR 72-500 landed, carrying the dignitaries on a special flight. Morava Airport was officially opened on 28 June 2019. Some earlier reports suggested that several carriers would introduce regular flights from the airport. The first commercial flight, to Vienna, was on 17 December 2019 with an ATR-72.

Airlines and destinations
The following airlines operate regular scheduled and seasonal flights from Morava:

Statistics

  
Passenger and Flight movements statistics (2019–2022)

Lađevci Military Air Base
The Lađevci Air Base is located at the airport. Operated by the Serbian Air Force and Air Defence, base is home to the most units of the 98th Air Brigade including: 241st Fighter-Bomber Squadron "Tigers", 714th Anti-armor Helicopter Squadron "Shadows", 353rd Reconnaissance Squadron "Hawks", 98th Air Defence Artillery Missile Battalion, 98th Air Technical Battalion and 98th Air Base Security Battalion.

Transport links

Public Transport

There is currently no direct public bus service to/from Morava Airport.

Taxi
Approximately 20 meters when leaving the airport terminal on the right side there is a parking lot with the taxi stand and bus stop. If you plan to use this type of transport, registered taxi carriers charge the "start" of 130 dinars (1.11 euros), which only includes the first kilometer of driving. Depending on the destination, the price of the ride varies from 1200 dinars (10.23 euros) to Kraljevo and 1500 dinars (12.78 euros) to Čačak.

Car Rental
There are three rent a car agencies available at the airport. Those are: AR Rent-a-car (www.arrentacar.rs), Budget (www.budget.rs) and SurPrice (www.surprice.rs).

Parking at the Airport
Parking at the Morava airport is currently free of charge, and has 120 parking positions for cars and 4 bus stops.

See also
 List of airports in Serbia
 Airports of Serbia
 Transport in Serbia
 AirSerbia

References

https://rtvkraljevo.com/2020/02/04/aerodrom-morava-i-privredna-komora/

External links
 Official website

Airports in Serbia
Serbian Air Force and Air Defence bases
Yugoslav Air Force bases